Abas is both a given name and a surname. Notable people with this name include:

Abas (sophist), an ancient Greek sophist and rhetorician
Abas, the ancient writer of a work entitled Troia from which Maurus Servius Honoratus (ad Aen. ix. 264) has preserved a fragment
Abas I of Armenia (?–953), king of Armenia from 928 to 953
Abas Arslanagić (born 1944), Bosnian handball player
Abas Basir (born 1968), Afghan academic and politician
Abas Ermenji (1913–2003), Albanian politician and historian
Abas Ismaili (born 1967), Iranian cyclist
Elisha Abas (born 1971), Israeli pianist
Salleh Abas (1929–2021), Malaysian chief justice
Stephen Abas (born 1978), American wrestler